Stefan Zierke (born 5 December 1970) is a German politician of the Social Democratic Party (SPD) who has been serving as a member of the Bundestag from the state of Brandenburg since 2013.

Political career 
Zierke became a member of the Bundestag in the 2013 German federal election, representing the Uckermark – Barnim I district. In parliament, he was a member of the Committee on Tourism and the Committee on Transport and Digital Infrastructure from 2013 until 2017. 

From 2018 until 2021, Zierke served as Parliamentary State Secretary at the Federal Ministry of Family Affairs, Senior Citizens, Women and Youth under successive ministers Franziska Giffey and Christine Lambrecht in the government of Chancellor Angela Merkel.

Since the 2021 elections, Zierke has been serving as his parliamentary group’s spokesperson for tourism.

Other activities 
 Business Forum of the Social Democratic Party of Germany, Member of the Political Advisory Board
 Federal Foundation for the Reappraisal of the SED Dictatorship, Member of the Board of Trustees
 Kurt Schumacher Society, Member of the Board

References

External links 

  
 Bundestag biography 

1970 births
Living people
Members of the Bundestag for Brandenburg
Members of the Bundestag 2021–2025
Members of the Bundestag 2017–2021
Members of the Bundestag 2013–2017
Members of the Bundestag for the Social Democratic Party of Germany